General Robert L. Maverick is a fictional character appearing in American comic books published by Marvel Comics. He is the second character to use the Red Hulk identity.

Publication history

Created by Al Ewing and Gerardo Sandoval, the character first appeared in New Avengers vol. 4 #9 (June 2016) and later as Red Hulk in U.S.Avengers #1 (Jan. 2017).

Fictional character biography
In his debut during the Avengers: Standoff! storyline, Robert oversaw Project: Troubleshooter and Todd Ziller's transformation into the American Kaiju. He sends American Kaiju after the New Avengers when they illegally break into S.H.I.E.L.D. to rescue Rick Jones, but was defeated.

After Sunspot defeated the Maker, Maverick invites Roberto da Costa to join the government, hoping that they could cooperate.

He joins the U.S.Avengers, where it's revealed that he is the new version of the Red Hulk, upon being provided with an improved version of the Bannerman Gene-Enhancement Package aka Hulk Plug-In. Unlike Thunderbolt Ross's Red Hulk form, Maverick maintains his mustache and wears sunglasses. In the team's first mission against the Secret Empire, the Red Hulk was able to level the Secret Empire's volcano island base upon crash-landing onto the base. They're later approached by a future version of Captain America when the Golden Skull came to their timeline to take all the wealth in the world. In Miami, Florida, the team crashes a charity gala only to discover that the wealthy CEOs were kidnapped and replaced by robots. The team manages to defeat and capture the Golden Skull who was wearing a golden armored suit, and Captain America takes back the Golden Skull as a prisoner to their timeline.

The Red Hulk is later sent to confront and defeat the out of control American Kaiju attacking Europe. During the hunt, he encounters Deadpool who was turned into a monster by the mad scientist Dr. Vandoom. He later appears in an underground lair where he encounters Gorilla-Man, just after he transforms back to normal. When Gorilla-Man attempts to pull his head off in order to build his Gorilla-Men army, Robert is rescued by Squirrel Girl who unleashes flying squirrels on the Gorilla-Men while defeating Gorilla-Man.

During the Secret Empire storyline, Maverick receives an injection of nanites by Agent Kyle to improve the Hulk Plug-In so he could remain as the Red Hulk longer. When the team arrives in Washington D.C., the Red Hulk begins to attack his teammates due to the nanites controlling him, where Agent Kyle is revealed to be a Hydra double agent. The Red Hulk and Iron Patriot are captured and imprisoned when they see Sunspot in one of the cells. While in prison, the Red Hulk is kept in a cell until he's brought out to battle Sunspot after having recovered from injuries. Sunspot's powers manage to burn the nanites inside him, enabling the Red Hulk to defeat the guards. They later take control of the prison. In the aftermath of the event, Robert is able to return to normal after Toni Ho deactivated the Hydra nanites in his blood. But due to his extended time as the Red Hulk, Robert can't risk to transform anymore due to his weakened health and his skin remains red.

Maverick then assists Smasher and the U.S.Avengers when Cannonball is found on the planet Kral X. They help Cannonball and the planet's rebels in overthrowing the ruler Ritchie. After restoring order to the planet, the heroes head home.

During the "No Surrender" arc, Earth was taken from its spot and most of the heroes are in stasis during a contest between the Grandmaster's Lethal Legion and the Challenger's Black Order. Robert is one of a few heroes not in stasis as he is among those who assist Voyager into interfering in the match. When his Hulk Plug-In times out and the Red Hulk regresses back, his allies learned what happened to him when Hydra's nanites overtaxed his Hulk Plug-In. While also mentioning his health problems that come with, Robert states that he still has the strength to lift a gun. Falcon tells Robert that he is being benched. When the Hulk is revived by Challenger to go after Voyager at the Avengers Auxiliary Headquarters to claim the Pyramoid that she has, Robert sees the Hulk defeating Cannonball, Enigma, and Lightning. Donning a version of the Iron Patriot armor, his Red Hulk form prepares to engage the Hulk in battle, dubbing himself as the Iron Hulk. He is able to stand his ground until the Hulk drains the Gamma energy out of his Hulk Plug-In, regresses him back to his human form and restores his original skin tone. The Vision buys Quicksilver time to get Maverick, Cannonball, Enigma, and Lightning away from the Hulk.

Powers and abilities
Robert Maverick is a military tactician. Using an improved variation of the Hulk Plug-In, his transformation into the Red Hulk is for an hour where he sports superhuman strength, stamina and durability that is supposedly on the same level as the Hulk's. He can also leap great distances and is resistant to fire.

In other media
Robert Maverick / Red Hulk appears as an alternate skin for Thunderbolt Ross / Red Hulk in Marvel: Future Fight.

References

External links
 Robert Maverick at Marvel Wiki
 Robert Maverick at Comic Vine

Avengers (comics) characters
Comics characters introduced in 2016
Fictional characters with nuclear or radiation abilities
Fictional characters with superhuman durability or invulnerability
Fictional generals
Fictional military strategists
Marvel Comics mutates
Marvel Comics cyborgs
Marvel Comics characters with superhuman strength
Marvel Comics male supervillains
Marvel Comics male superheroes
Marvel Comics military personnel